Damai LRT station may refer to:

 Damai LRT station (Singapore)
 Damai LRT station (Malaysia)